Calvin Owens (April 23, 1929 – February 21, 2008) was an American blues trumpeter, bandleader, and composer/arranger.  Owens grew up in Houston's Fifth Ward neighborhood and was influenced by Louis Armstrong. At various times, Owens worked alongside B.B. King, Pete Mayes, T-Bone Walker, Amos Milburn, David "Fathead" Newman, Arnett Cobb, Junior Parker, Otis Turner, Willie Nelson and Johnny Bush.

Early life and career
The son of Blanche Ware and adopted father Sam Owens; Owen's mother, who was from New Orleans, related to Calvin her memories of Louis Armstrong playing in the jazz city when she was a young teenager.  Having become fascinated with the instrument, Owens worked odd jobs and saved enough money to buy his first instrument at the age of 13.

Owens graduated from  Phillis Wheatley High School in 1949 but had, by that time, already started playing professionally.

Collaborations with B.B. King 
Having played professionally in Houston, including at the Eldorado from 1950 to 1953 as well as being the audio and recording director for Peacock Records, Owens was hired by B. B. King in two periods — from 1953 until 1957 and later from 1978 to 1984.

Death
Sometimes known as the Maestro, Owens died on February 21, 2008, from renal failure, at the age of 78.

References

1929 births
2008 deaths
Musicians from Houston
American male trumpeters
American bandleaders
American music arrangers
20th-century American male musicians